Matthias Hinze (7 February 1969 in Berlin – 13 April 2007 in Berlin) was a German actor who specializes in dubbing.

Filmography 
 1984: Eine Klasse für sich
 1985: Teufels Großmutter as Friedrich
 1988: NordlichterNordlichter
 1988: War and Remembrance
 1992: Gute Zeiten, schlechte Zeiten as Peter Becker

Notable voice roles
 15 productions as Matt Damon
 4 productions as James Marsden
 Dragon Ball Z: Wrath of the Dragon as Tapion
 Meine Liebe as Orpherus
 Phantom Quest Corp. as Higashi Narita (Ep. 3)
 Spirit of Wonder as Jim Floyd
 Spirit of Wonder Scientific Boys Club as Jim Floyd
 Tenjho Tenge as Shin Natsume
 X as Seishirou Sakurazuka

References
 
 
 Matthias Hinze, Deutsche Synchronkartei

1969 births
2007 deaths
German male television actors
German male voice actors
Male actors from Berlin
20th-century German male actors